Copelatus strigosulus is a species of diving beetle. It is part of the subfamily Copelatinae in the family Dytiscidae. It was described by Fairmaire in 1878.

References

strigosulus
Beetles described in 1878